Air Marshal Amar Preet Singh,  PVSM, AVSM is an officer of the Indian Air Force. He is serving as the 47th Vice Chief of the Air Staff. He assumed the office on February 1, 2023 succeeding Air Marshal  Sandeep Singh.

Early life and education 
Amar Preet Singh is an alumnus of  Defence Services Staff College, National Defence College and National Defence Academy.

Career
Amar Preet Singh was commissioned as a fighter pilot in the Indian Air Force on 21 December, 1984. In a distinguished career spanning 38 years, he has flown a variety of fighter and trainer aircraft with more than 4900 hours of operational flying. He is a Qualified Flying Instructor and an experimental test pilot with service flying on a variety of fixed wing and rotary wing aircraft.

With a long career of 38 years, he has commanded an air base. He has commanded the 22 squadron hosting the MiG-27. He served as the Chief Test Pilot at Aircraft and Systems Testing Establishment and served as the Project Director at National Flight Test Center, Aeronautical Development Agency.

He spearheaded the MiG-29 upgrade Project Management Team at Moscow, Russia and was instrumental in flight testing of HAL Tejas.

As the Air Vice Marshal, he served as the  Air Defence Commanding of South Western Air Command and Project Director at National Flight Test Center, Aeronautical Development Agency.

He served as the Air Officer Commanding-in-Chief (AOC-in-C), Central Air Command. He assumed the office on 1 July 2022 succeeding Air Marshal Richard John Duckworth. Previously, he served as Senior Air Staff Officer of the Eastern Air Command.

Prior to being promoted to AOC-in-C, he served as the Senior Air Staff Officer, Eastern Air Command.

Honours and decorations 
During his career, Amar Preet Singh was awarded the Ati Vishisht Seva Medal in 2019 and Param Vishisht Seva Medal in 2023.

Personal life 
He is married to Mrs Sarita Singh. The couple is blessed with a son and a daughter.

References 

Indian Air Force air marshals
Recipients of the Ati Vishisht Seva Medal
Year of birth missing (living people)
Living people
Vice Chiefs of Air Staff (India)
Defence Services Staff College alumni
National Defence College, India alumni
National Defence Academy (India) alumni